Open Book is a book and literary arts center in Minneapolis, Minnesota, housing three nonprofit organizations: The Loft Literary Center, Minnesota Center for Book Arts and Milkweed Editions. It also has the Ruminator Books and the Coffee Gallery. It includes a 50,000 square foot space on four floors. The building has approximately 10,000 visitors a month and includes an Orchestra Hall and a theater.

History
Opened May 21, 2000, Open Book was founded by Linda Myers of The Loft Literary Center, Peggy Korsmo-Kennon of the Minnesota Center for Book Arts and Emilie Buchwald of Milkweed Editions in an effort to create a more permanent home for their respective organisations. It was fully funded by contributions they received from individuals, corporations and foundations and was not funded with government money.  

Former Minneapolis Mayor R. T. Rybak described the center as an "important anchor" for creative growth in the Washington Avenue area.

Awards 
In 2015, they received a $10,000 MetLife Foundation Innovation Space Award.

References

External links

Arts centers in Minnesota
Arts organizations based in Minneapolis
Non-profit organizations based in Minnesota
Arts organizations established in 2000
2000 establishments in Minnesota